Will or William Norton may refer to:

Literary figures
William A. Norton (1810–1883), American engineer, educator and author
William Warder Norton (1891–1945), American book publisher and founder of W. W. Norton
William W. Norton (1925–2010), American Hollywood screenwriter

Political figures
William Norton, English MP for Middlesex in 1391
William Norton, 2nd Baron Grantley (1742–1822), British MP
William Norton (1900–1963), Irish Labour Party leader from 1932 through 1960
William Harrison Norton, American state senator from Missouri during 1950s

Sports figures
William Norton (cricketer) (1820–1873), English cricketer for Kent
William Norton (rugby union) (1862–1898), Wales international three-quarter
William G. Norton (before 1870–1895), American football coach
William South Norton (1831–1916), English cricketer for Kent
Will Norton, English rugby player on List of 2020–21 RFU Championship transfers

Other
William R. Norton (1853–1938), American architect and founder of Sunnyslope, Arizona